Toei Hero Next is a series of Japanese movies created and produced by Toei Company.

Description
Started in 2012, Toei Hero Next gave the cast of recently aired Toei Tokusatsu shows (Kamen Rider and Super Sentai) a chance to work together again on a completely different project and showcase the actors acting skills.

Movies

Piece ~Fragments of a Memory Toei Hero Next #1  

This is the first installment of the Toei Hero Next series that was released on September 1, 2012. It features actors Shu Watanabe and Ryosuke Miura from Kamen Rider OOO.

My Future Of Being Executed Toei Hero Next #2 

The second installment of Toei Hero Next series that was released on November 23, 2012. It feature actors Sota Fukushi and Ryo Yoshizawa from Kamen Rider Fourze.

Love Gear Toei Hero Next #3 

The third installment of the Toei Hero Next series that was released on February 9, 2013. It feature actors Ryota Ozawa, Junya Ikeda, and Kazuki Shimizu from Kaizoku Sentai Gokaiger.

We're the Bounty Hunter Troupe Toei Hero Next #4 

The fourth installment of the Toei Hero Next series that was released on June 7, 2014. It feature actors Ryo Ryusei, Syuusuke Saito, Yamato Kinjo, Akihisa Shiono, Ayuri Konno, and Atsushi Maruyama from Zyuden Sentai Kyoryuger.

References

External links
Toei Hero Next Official Website

Japanese film series